The Sicilian Alliance (it.: Alleanza Siciliana; sic.: Allianza Siciliana) was a minor autonomist and national-conservative political party in Sicily, Italy.

It was founded in 2005 and was led by Nello Musumeci, an MEP who was elected on the list of National Alliance.

On 7 October 2007, the party joined to Francesco Storace's The Right, although maintaining some of its autonomy as a regional section of the party, named "The Right – Sicilian Alliance", often shortened to "The Sicilian Right".

In the 2012 regional election the party gained four regional deputies in the Musumeci List (Gino Ioppolo, Santi Formica, Carmelo Currenti and the same Nello Musumeci). 
In 2014 Musumeci founded the movement #Diventerà Bellissima  and in November 2017 is elected President of Sicily.

See also
Southern Italy autonomist movements

References

External links
http://www.ladestrasiciliana.it/

National conservative parties
Political parties established in 2005
Sicilian nationalist parties
Political parties in Sicily
The Autonomy